In intuitionistic logic, the Harrop formulae, named after Ronald Harrop, are the class of formulae inductively defined as follows:

 Atomic formulae are Harrop, including falsity (⊥);
  is Harrop for any well-formed formula ;
  is Harrop provided  is.

By excluding disjunction and existential quantification (except in the antecedent of implication), non-constructive predicates are avoided, which has benefits for computer implementation.  From a constructivist point of view, Harrop formulae are "well-behaved."  For example, in Heyting arithmetic, Harrop formulae satisfy a classical equivalence not usually satisfied in constructive logic:

 

Harrop formulae were introduced around 1956 by Ronald Harrop and independently by Helena Rasiowa.  Variations of the fundamental concept are used in different branches of constructive mathematics and logic programming.

Hereditary Harrop formulae and logic programming
A more complex definition of hereditary Harrop formulae is used in logic programming as a generalisation of Horn clauses, and forms the basis for the language λProlog. Hereditary Harrop formulae are defined in terms of two (sometimes three) recursive sets of formulae. In one formulation:

 Rigid atomic formulae, i.e. constants  or formulae , are hereditary Harrop;
  is hereditary Harrop provided  is;

G-formulae are defined as follows:

 Atomic formulae are G-formulae, including truth(⊤);
  is a G-formula provided  is;
  is a G-formula provided  is;

See also 
 Realizability

References

Constructivism (mathematics)
Intuitionism